General of the Army (abbreviated as GA) is a five-star general officer and the second-highest possible rank in the United States Army. It is generally equivalent to the rank of Field Marshal in other countries. In the United States, a General of the Army ranks above generals and is equivalent to a fleet admiral and a general of the Air Force. The General of the Army insignia consisted of five  stars in a pentagonal pattern, with touching points. The insignia was paired with the gold and enameled United States Coat of Arms on service coat shoulder loops. The silver colored five-star metal insignia alone would be worn for use as a collar insignia of grade and on the garrison cap. Soft shoulder epaulettes with five  stars in silver thread and gold-threaded United States Coat of Arms on green cloth were worn with shirts and sweaters.

The rank of "General of the Army" has had two incarnations. The first was introduced in 1866, following the American Civil War. It was a four-star rank reserved for the Commanding General of the United States Army, and was held by three different men from 1866 to 1888: Ulysses S. Grant, William Tecumseh Sherman, and Philip Sheridan. The rank was revived during World War II as the modern five-star rank, and may be awarded to more than one serving officer at a time. It has been held by five different men since 1944: George C. Marshall, Douglas MacArthur, Dwight D. Eisenhower, Henry H. Arnold, and Omar Bradley.

A special rank of General of the Armies, which ranks above the second incarnation of General of the Army, exists but has been conferred only twice to World War I's John J. Pershing, and posthumously to George Washington. In December 2022, the James M. Inhofe National Defense Authorization Act for Fiscal Year 2023 authorized Ulysses S. Grant to be posthumously promoted to the rank, 137 years after his death. However, the president of the United States has yet to appoint him to the rank.

History

Post–American Civil War era

On 25 July 1866, the U.S. Congress established the rank of "General of the Army of the United States" for General Ulysses S. Grant. His pay was "four hundred dollars per month, and his allowance for fuel and quarters", except "when his headquarters are in Washington, shall be at the rate of three hundred dollars per month." (His combined monthly pay and allowance of seven hundred dollars in 1866 is ). When appointed General of the Army, Grant wore the rank insignia of four stars and coat buttons arranged in three groups of four.

Unlike the World War II rank with a similar title, the 1866 rank of General of the Army was a four-star rank. This rank held all the authority and power of a 1799 proposal for a rank of "General of the Armies", even though Grant was never called by this title.  Despite being titled General of the Army instead of General of the Armies, the Comptroller General of the United States would rule in 1924 that the grade revived in 1866 for Grant (and later William T. Sherman and Philip H. Sheridan) was the same grade that had been proposed for Washington in 1799 and revived for Pershing in 1919.

In contrast to the modern four-star rank of general, only one officer at a time could hold the 1866–1888 rank of General of the Army. For a few months in 1885, as he was dying, Grant was accorded a special honor and his rank was restored by Congressional legislation.

After Grant became U.S. president, he was succeeded as General of the Army by William T. Sherman, effective 4 March 1869. In 1872, Sherman ordered the insignia changed to two stars, with the coat of arms of the United States in between.

By an Act of Congress on 1 June 1888, the grade was conferred upon Philip Sheridan, who by then was in failing health. The rank of General of the Army ceased to exist with Sheridan's death on 5 August 1888.

Generals of the Army (post Civil War)

World War II and Korean War era
As the logistics and military leadership requirements of World War II escalated after the June 1944 Normandy landings, the United States government created a new version of General of the Army. The five-star rank and authority of General of the Army and equivalent naval Fleet Admiral were created by an Act of Congress on a temporary basis when  was passed on 14 December 1944, which provided only 75% of pay and allowances to the grade for those on the retired list. The rank was temporary, subject to reversion to permanent rank six months after the end of the war. It was created to give the most senior American commanders parity of rank with their British counterparts holding the ranks of field marshal and admiral of the fleet. This second General of the Army rank is not the same as the post-Civil War era version because of its purpose and five stars.

The insignia for the 1944 General of the Army rank consists of five stars in a pentagonal pattern, with points touching.  The five officers who have held the 1944 version of General of the Army and the date of each's appointment are as follows:

Generals of the Army (WWII) 

The timing of the first four of these appointments was coordinated with the first three of the following appointments of the U.S. Navy's first five-star Fleet Admirals:

This was to establish both an order of seniority among the generals and a near-equivalence between the services.

Although briefly considered, the U.S. Army did not introduce a rank of Field Marshal. In the United States, the term "Marshal" has traditionally been used for civilian law enforcement officers, particularly the U.S. Marshals, as well as formerly for state and local police chiefs. In addition, giving the rank the name "marshal" would have resulted in George Marshall being designated as "Field Marshal Marshall", which was considered undignified.

Eisenhower resigned his army commission on 31 May 1952 to run for the U.S. presidency. After Eisenhower was elected and served two terms, President John F. Kennedy on 22 March 1961 signed , which authorized reappointing Eisenhower "to the active list of the Regular Army in his former grade, of General of the Army with his former date of rank in such grade". This rank is today commemorated on the signs denoting Interstate Highways as part of the Eisenhower Interstate System, which display five silver stars on a light blue background.

Arnold, a general in the Army, was the Commanding General of the Army Air Forces throughout World War II, when he was promoted. After his United States Air Force became a separate service on 18 September 1947, Arnold's rank was carried over to the Air Force, just as all Army Air Forces airmen's rank carried over. Arnold was the first and, to date, only General of the Air Force. He is also the only person to have ever held a five-star rank in two branches of the U.S. Armed Forces.

These officers who held the rank of General of the Army remained officers of the United States Army for life, with an annual $20,000 in pay and allowances, . They were entitled to an office maintained by the Army along with an aide (of the rank of colonel), a secretary, and an orderly.

Modern usage

No officers have been appointed to the rank of General of the Army since Omar Bradley (who was also the last living officer of such rank when he died in 1981).  The rank is still maintained in the Army's structure, and could be awarded by the president with the consent of the United States Senate.

Although the first Chairman of the Joint Chiefs of Staff (CJCS), Omar Bradley, was eventually awarded a fifth star, such a promotion does not come with that office; Bradley's elevation ensured that he would not be outranked by his subordinate, Douglas MacArthur.

In the 1990s, there were proposals in Department of Defense academic circles to bestow a five-star rank on the office of the Chairman of the Joint Chiefs of Staff.

After the conclusion of the Persian Gulf War, but before his tenure as Secretary of State, there was talk of awarding a fifth star to General Colin Powell, who had served as CJCS during the conflict. But even in the face of public and Congressional pressure to do so, Clinton presidential transition team staffers decided against it for political reasons, fearing that a fifth star may have assisted Powell (a Republican) had he decided to run for office. An effort was also made to promote General Norman Schwarzkopf Jr. to General of the Army, although it was not carried out.

As recently as the late 2000s, some commentators proposed that the military leader in the Global War on Terrorism be promoted to a five-star rank. In January 2011, the founders of the Vets for Freedom political advocacy group published an op-ed in The Wall Street Journal calling for David Petraeus to be  awarded a fifth star in recognition of his work and the importance of his mission. Earlier, in July 2010, D.B. Grady wrote an article in The Atlantic supporting the same promotion.

Ranks senior to General of the Army

The rank of General of the Armies is senior to General of the Army, and the rank by this name has been bestowed on only three officers in U.S. history. In 1919, John J. Pershing was promoted to General of the Armies for his services in World War I. In 1976, during the United States Bicentennial, George Washington was posthumously promoted to this rank for his service as the first commanding general of the United States Army. In 2022, Ulysses S. Grant was posthumously promoted to the rank of General of the Armies to celebrate 200 years since his birth. In 1903, retroactive to 1899, George Dewey was promoted to Admiral of the Navy, a rank equated to that of a five-star admiral. The promotion of Admiral Dewey is the only time an Admiral of the Navy has been named and the rank ceased to exist after his death.

Section 7 of Public Law 78-482 read: "Nothing in this Act shall affect the provisions of the Act of September 3, 1919 (41 Stat. 283: 10 U.S.C. 671a), or any other law relating to the office of General of the Armies of the United States."

George Washington was posthumously promoted to the rank of General of the Armies on 15 March 1978 by Secretary of the Army Clifford Alexander. In relation to America's bicentennial celebration, Congress passed legislation on 19 January 1976 urging Washington's promotion and President Gerald Ford approved it in October 1976, but historians found that Congressional and Presidential actions were not enough, and that the Army had to issue orders to make the promotion official. According to Public Law 94-479, General of the Armies of the United States is established as having "rank and precedence over all other grades of the Army, past or present." Thus, Washington will always be the most senior general of the United States. During his lifetime, Washington was appointed a general in the Continental Army during the Revolutionary War, and a three-star lieutenant general in the Regular Army during the Quasi-War with France.

See also 
 List of United States military leaders by rank
 General officers in the United States
 United States Army officer rank insignia
 List of comparative military ranks
 List of field marshals
 Six-star rank
 Supreme Allied Commander

References 

Five-star officers
Military ranks of the United States Army